Kristina Elez (born 22 May 1987 as Kristina Franić) is a Croatian handball player and a member of the Croatian national team. She plays for the Turkish club Kastamonu Bld. GSK.
She participated in the 2008 European Championship, where Croatia finished 6th. Franić was among the top-ten goal scorers of the tournament.

Achievements
Croatian First League:
Winner: 2003, 2005, 2006, 2007, 2008, 2009, 2015
Croatian Cup:
Winner: 2003, 2004, 2006, 2008, 2009, 2015
Championnat de France:
Winner: 2011
Coupe de France:
Winner: 2010
Coupe de la Ligue:
Winner: 2010, 2011
Slovenian Championship:
Winner: 2012
Slovenian Cup:
Winner: 2012

References

1987 births
Living people
Sportspeople from Split, Croatia
People from Solin
Croatian female handball players
Olympic handball players of Croatia
Handball players at the 2012 Summer Olympics
Expatriate handball players
Croatian expatriate sportspeople in France
Croatian expatriate sportspeople in Slovenia
Croatian expatriate sportspeople in Hungary
RK Podravka Koprivnica players